The Gura Văii is a right tributary of the river Pruteț in Romania. It discharges into the Pruteț near Stănilești.

References

Rivers of Romania
Rivers of Vaslui County